Lago Vista, Texas ("Lake View" in English) is a lakeside community located on the northern shores of Lake Travis. The city is located within Travis County, Texas, United States, and is less than 20 miles from downtown Austin, Texas. Much of Lago Vista is located on a peninsula that extends across 15.52 square miles of Texas Hill Country. The Colorado River runs adjacent to the city.

Travis County, Texas experienced a population increase of 26.9% between 2010–2020. Lago Vista grew by 47.3% during that time.

Geography

The peninsular city sits adjacent to, and partially within, the Balcones Canyonlands. Lago Vista has rugged terrain with elevations ranging from 774 ft (236 m) above sea level at the lake shore to 1220 ft (372 m) above sea level near Rusty Allen Airport. The area is characterized by steep limestone hills and canyons, some of the highest in Travis County.

Climate

Demographics

2020 Census 
As of the 2020 United States census, there were 8,896 people, 2,996 households, and 2,053 families residing in the city. The city has grown by 47.3% since the 2010 Census. On average, 2.41 persons occupy each household in the city. 49.5% of Lago Vistans are female, while 50.5% are male. 26% of the population is over the age of 65, 16.3% of the population is under 18 years of age, and 3.8% of the Lago Vista population is under 5 years of age.

7.9% of Lago Vistans were born outside of the United States and 15.3% of the city speaks a language other than English at home.

Approximately 93.4% of households have access to a computer and 86.7% of households have a broadband internet subscription. 94.5% of city residents have obtained a high school education or higher while 35.7% of Lago Vistans have obtained a bachelor’s degree or higher.

The median income for a household in the city was $80,705 and the per capita income over the last 12 months was $47,058. The median value of owner-occupied housing units was approximately $282,700, while the median gross rent cost in the city was $1,209. Approximately 6.5% of Lago Vistans live at or below the poverty line.

The next population count in the city will take place during the 2030 United States Census.

Political affiliation 
Lago Vista is predominantly a Republican community. In the 2020 presidential election, Lago Vista supported Republican incumbent Donald Trump by margins varying from 60% to 65% compared to Democratic nominee Joe Biden. In the House of Representatives, Lago Vista is served by Republican Roger Williams as part of Texas's 25th congressional district.

Economy
Lago Vista has experienced tremendous population and economic growth as a result of the ongoing increase in net in-migration into Travis County and the Greater Austin metropolitan statistical area. The region is considered a major center for high tech and is host to hundreds of offices and headquarters for technology companies. The Texas Hill Country is often referred to as "Silicon Hills" due to the high concentration of high tech companies in the area. As of 2022, Travis County ranked among the wealthiest counties in Texas; with a per capita income of $74,032, a median home value of $519,353, and a per capita investment income of $38,381.

Arts and culture

Annual events
March: La Primavera Bike Race
March: Lago Vista Players
April: Hill Country Singers
April: Balcones Songbird Festival
April/May: LAGO FEST Texas 
July: Fourth of July Parade and Fireworks
August: Viva Lake Travis Casino Night
October: National Night Out and Trunk-or-Treat
November: Hill Country Singers
December (First Monday): Christmas Tree Lighting Celebration and Trail of Lights

Government
Lago Vista was incorporated in 1984 with a council-manager system of local government following attempts by the City of Austin to annex the area in the early 1980's. Lago Vista's seven council members serve two-year terms. The mayor and council members one, three, and five are elected in odd years. Members two, four, and six are elected in even years. The Lago Vista City Council meets regularly on the first and third Thursday of each month with additional Special Called Meetings. Tracie Hlavinka is the current city manager. The immediate past City Manager, Josh Ray, resigned in January 2020. City Hall, Municipal Court, and Lago Vista's government offices are located at 5803 Thunderbird Street in the city's business district.

Lago Vista 2030 Comprehensive Plan 
In 2016, the Lago Vista City Council adopted the Lago Vista 2030 Comprehensive Plan as its comprehensive planning document for the next decade. The plan provides a snapshot of projected demographic trends, expected land use activity, transportation requirements, and overall neighborhood livability and quality of life.

State representatives 
At the state level, Lago Vista is represented in the Texas House of Representatives (District 47) by Democrat Vikki Goodwin. The city is represented in the Texas Senate (District 14) by Democrat Sarah Eckhardt. The city is represented in the Texas Board of Education (District 10) by Republican Tom Maynard.

Education

Almost all of Lago Vista is in the Lago Vista Independent School District, with a portion of the city limits extending to the Marble Falls Independent School District. The former operates Lago Vista High School.

The majority of Travis County, including portions in Lago Vista ISD, are in the Austin Community College district.

The largest nearby universities serving the Lago Vista area are located in neighboring Austin. Austin is home to the University of Texas at Austin, the flagship institution of the University of Texas System with over 40,000 undergraduate students and 11,000 graduate students.

Infrastructure

Transportation

Roadways

RM 1431 is the main artery road providing access into Lago Vista.

Public transportation

The Capital Metropolitan Transportation Authority (CapMetro) is a transportation provider based in Austin that operates local bus services between Lago Vista and varying transfer points across the greater Austin area. Route 214 operates between Lago Vista and Lakeline Station in northwestern Austin (local fares apply). CapMetro also offers an on-demand public transportation rideshare service in Lago Vista called Pickup which was developed by Via.

Airports
Rusty Allen Airport (RYW) is a municipal single runway airport on the northern edge of the city, though the airport is exclusively a general aviation airport. Regularly-scheduled commercial air services' closest link to Lago Vista is at Austin–Bergstrom International Airport.

Media
The main daily newspaper representing the Austin metropolitan area (which includes the city of Lago Vista) is the Austin-American Statesman. Other regional publications and newspapers in the area include: Austin 360, Austin Business Journal, Austin Chronicle, Austin Monitor, Community Impact Newspaper, El Mundo, Hill Country News, do512, and the North Shore Beacon.

Commercial radio stations in the Lago Vista area include KASE-FM (country), KVET (sports), KVET-FM (country), KKMJ-FM (adult contemporary), KLBJ (talk), KLBJ-FM (classic rock), KJFK (variety hits), KFMK (contemporary Christian), KOKE-FM (progressive country) and KPEZ (rhythmic contemporary). KUT-FM is the leading public radio station in Texas and produces the majority of its content locally. KOOP (FM) is a volunteer-run radio station with more than 60 locally produced programs. Additionally, 1670 AM (LagoRadio) streams music from the 60’s, 70's, and 80’s directly from Lago Vista and provides updates on important happenings in the North Shore communities (Lago Vista, Jonestown and Point Venture) of Lake Travis.

Network television stations (affiliations in parentheses) include KTBC (Fox O&O), KVUE (ABC), KXAN (NBC), KEYE-TV (CBS), KLRU (PBS), KNVA (The CW), KBVO (MyNetworkTV), and KAKW (Univision O&O).

Notes

References

External links
 
 Lago Vista Area Chamber of Commerce
 City of Lago Vista

Cities in Texas
Cities in Travis County, Texas
Cities in Greater Austin